Mario Alberto Dávila Delgado (born 26 December 1959) is a Mexican politician affiliated with the National Action Party. He currently serves as Deputy of the LXII Legislature of the Mexican Congress representing Coahuila.

References

1959 births
Living people
Politicians from Coahuila
National Action Party (Mexico) politicians
People from Frontera, Coahuila
21st-century Mexican politicians
Deputies of the LXII Legislature of Mexico
Members of the Chamber of Deputies (Mexico) for Coahuila